The 2003–04 Copa del Rey was the 102nd staging of the Copa del Rey.

The competition began on 24 August 2003 and concluded on 17 March 2004 with the final, held at the Estadi Olímpic Lluís Companys in Barcelona, in which Zaragoza lifted the trophy following a 3–2 victory over Real Madrid after extra time. The final match was played six days after the 2004 Madrid train bombings and three days after the 2004 Spanish general election.

First round 
First leg:

Second leg:

Round of 64

Round of 32

Knock-out rounds

Round of 16 

|}

First leg:

Second leg:

Quarter-finals 

|}

First leg

Second leg

Semi-finals 

|}

First leg

Second leg

Final

Top goalscorers

References

External links 
 Spain Cup Tournaments – 2003/04, at rsssf

Copa del Rey seasons
1